Theodore L. S. "Scott" Davie (born 15 February 1940) is an Australian former basketball player. He competed in the men's tournament at the 1964 Summer Olympics.

References

1940 births
Living people
Australian men's basketball players
Olympic basketball players of Australia
Basketball players at the 1964 Summer Olympics
Basketball players from Adelaide
20th-century Australian people
21st-century Australian people